Newman, originally named Mount Newman until 1981, is a town in the Pilbara region of Western Australia. It can be reached by the Great Northern Highway. Newman is a modern mining town, with homes contrasting with the surrounding reddish desert. The 2021 population was 6,456.

History

Newman was established as Mount Newman by Mt. Newman Mining Co. Pty Ltd (a subsidiary of BHP) in 1966 as a company town to support the development of iron ore deposits at nearby Mount Whaleback. The town takes its name from nearby Mount Newman, named in honour of government surveyor Aubrey Woodward Newman (son of Edward Newman who also died young) who died of typhoid aged 28 at Cue on 24 May 1896, while on an expedition from Nannine to the Ophthalmia Range. William Frederick Rudall then took charge of the expedition and named Mount Newman to honour his deceased leader.

Aboriginal occupation of the area extends to around 45,000 years. The Martu people comprise about a dozen language groups that extend across the Gibson and Great Sandy Deserts. The Martu progressively lost their land and nomadic lifestyle as European expansion crept inland from the late 19th century. Western exploration, the establishment of Christian missions, and gold discoveries at Marble Bar and Wiluna led to Indigenous people being forced from their ancestral lands.

Commercial area and amenities

Typical of company towns, Newman is laid out with a core, where shopping and hotels are located, surrounded by residential areas, with more industrial activities on the outskirts. There are two supermarkets in town (one Woolworths and an IGA), two shopping plazas, three hotels, and three bars/restaurants outside of those contained in the hotels. One public outdoor pool serves the town's population.

In late 2017, Parnawarri Retail centre (Parnawarri meaning "united" or "all together" in Nyiyaparli) was opened and housed the towns second supermarket (IGA) as well as a Dome coffeehouse, SportsPower and a Chicken Treat. BHP invested $30 million to build the retail centre.

The town contains Newman Primary School, South Newman Primary School, Newman Senior High School, and Rawa Community School.

Transport and infrastructure

Newman is located at the end of route 138 meeting the Great Northern Highway.

The town is served by Newman Airport.

A privately owned railway, the Mount Newman railway, was constructed linking it to Port Hedland which itself was upgraded to handle shipment of the ore to the world market. The ore trains are typically over 2 km long. Newman is also a service town to the nearby mining settlements like Tom Price and Paraburdoo.

Electricity is supplied by Alinta from its 180 MW gas-fired power station with a 30MW/11MWh Kokam battery at Newman. The station also supplies the Roy Hill mine,
 with grid construction reaching the Cloudbreak and Christmas Creek mines.

Architecture
Being founded in the 1960s, Newman's architecture reflects the modernist styles of that decade and the next, being predominantly functional and devoid of detail or embellishment. As the town was founded and built by a steel company, the majority of buildings use a steel frame construction. This applies to the homes themselves, most of them being two prefabricated halves inserted together into a steel I-section frame, the columns of which are left exposed on the exterior of the home.  This construction method serves not only to showcase the company's product, but also gives strong resistance to cyclone winds which can affect the region from time to time. For this same reason most houses are elevated from the ground by a few steps. Many houses also have large air-conditioning units situated next to them to provide adequate cooling against the very hot summer temperatures.

Climate
Newman has a hot desert climate (Köppen climate classification BWh), with very hot summers and mild winters. The temperature reaches or exceeds  for many days in the summer.

Precipitation is sparse, but the influx of monsoonal moisture in the summer, which generally begins in December and lasts until April, raises humidity levels and can cause occasional heavy storms.

See also
 Pilbara historical timeline
 Pilbara newspapers
 Red Dog (Pilbara)

References

Further reading
 Austin, Noel (1999) The Newman story, 1967-1969. Publication details not known - held at Battye library, Perth, Western Australia
 DuBois, Lesley et al. (1994) Moving a mountain: an historic illustrated and photographic study of the town of Newman. Perth, Western Australia: L. DuBois
 Eckhart, Peter (1996) Whaleback tales. Carlisle, Western Australia: Hesperian Press.

External links

Shire of East Pilbara
Mining towns in Western Australia
1966 establishments in Australia
Populated places established in 1966